Hurricane Hutch in Many Adventures is a 1924 British silent comedy action film directed by Charles Hutchison and starring Charles Hutchison, Warwick Ward and Malcolm Tod.

Cast
 Charles Hutchison - Hurricane Hutch
 Warwick Ward - Dick
 Malcolm Tod - Frank Mitchell
 Edith Thornton - Nancy Norris
 Robert Vallis - Hugh
 Ernest A. Douglas - Mr. Mitchell
 Daisy Campbell - Mrs. Mitchell
 Cecil Rayne - Butler

References

External links
 

1924 films

British silent feature films

Ideal Film Company films
British black-and-white films
British action comedy films
1920s action comedy films
1924 comedy films
Films directed by Charles Hutchison
1920s English-language films
1920s British films
Silent comedy films